This page lists notable US and UK albums, singles and compilations which feature music written by Andrew Lloyd Webber, alongside their release dates.

Show Recordings

The Likes of Us (1965)

Joseph and the Amazing Technicolor Dreamcoat (1968)

Jesus Christ Superstar (1970)

Jeeves (1975) / By Jeeves (1996)

Evita (1976)

Tell Me On A Sunday (1979)

Cats (1981)

Song and Dance (1982)

Starlight Express (1984)

The Phantom of the Opera (1986)

Aspects of Love (1989)

Sunset Boulevard (1993)

Whistle Down the Wind (1996)

The Beautiful Game (2000)

The Woman in White (2004)

Love Never Dies (2010)

The Wizard of Oz (2011)

Stephen Ward (2013)

School of Rock (2015)

Cinderella (2021)

Standalone albums

Live recordings

Soundtracks

The Odessa File (1974)

Singles

Notable songs and covers

Compilations
Lloyd Webber's Really Useful Records which, for a number of years, had an exclusive partnership with Polydor, released a number of compilations:
The Premiere Collection: The Best of Andrew Lloyd Webber (1988)
Andrew Lloyd Webber: The Premiere Collection Encore (1993)
The Very Best of Andrew Lloyd Webber (1994)
The Very Best of Andrew Lloyd Webber: The Broadway Collection (1996)
The Andrew Lloyd Webber Collection (1997)
Andrew Lloyd Webber: Now & Forever [Box Set] (2001)
Gold: The Definitive Hit Singles Collection (2001), released in the US as Gold: The Definitive Hits Collection, but with different artists performing the songs
Divas (2006) 
Andrew Lloyd Webber 60 (2008)
Unmasked: The Platinum Collection (2018)
Other notable compilation albums, produced by other labels, include:
 Michael Crawford Performs Andrew Lloyd Webber (1991)
 The Magic of Andrew Lloyd Webber: Performed by the Orlando Pops Orchestra (1999)
 The Music of Andrew Lloyd Webber (2011)

References

Webber, Andrew Lloyd